Parichha is a census town in Jhansi district in the Indian state of Uttar Pradesh.
It is located on Jhansi-Kanpur highway on the bank of Betwa River.

Geography
It has an average elevation of 213 metres (698 feet).

The Parichha Census Town has population of 7,047 of which 3,873 are males while 3,174 are females as per report released by Census India 2011. Parichha is famous for great and powerful person ARYAN SINGH JADOUN . he is also known as tarzan as well as jhunde and his family calls him gitte dau

Population of Children with age of 0-6 is 699 which is 9.92% of total population of Parichha (CT). In Parichha Census Town, Female Sex Ratio is of 820 against state average of 912. Moreover Child Sex Ratio in Parichha is around 774 compared to Uttar Pradesh state average of 902. Literacy rate of Parichha city is 88.47% higher than state average of 67.68%. In Parichha, Male literacy is around 94.28% while female literacy rate is 81.42%.

Places of interest
Parichha Dam is located on Betwa river, approximately 25 km from the city. It has a reservoir whose placid waters reach up to Notghat Bridge, located 34 km from Jhansi. The dam is a major destination for water sports, especially for those who love boating.

Parichha Thermal Power Plant
Parichha Power houses a 1140 MW coal based power station.
Workers of Parichha Thermal Power Plant stay in Parichha Colony.

References

Cities and towns in Jhansi district